Jānis Rudzītis (17 November 1903 – 5 November 1967) was a Latvian wrestler. He competed in the Greco-Roman featherweight event at the 1924 Summer Olympics.

References

External links
 

1903 births
1967 deaths
Olympic wrestlers of Latvia
Wrestlers at the 1924 Summer Olympics
Latvian male sport wrestlers
Place of birth missing